IPX may refer to:

Internetwork Packet Exchange, Novell's network protocol 
IP eXchange, GSM Association's protocol 
IP Code, IPX Waterproof ratings
 synonym of Hirose U.FL, a small coaxial connector form
Interplanetary Expeditions, a corporation in Babylon 5